Paul Cammermans (10 July 1921 – 22 January 1999) was a Belgian film director and actor. His 1986 film The van Paemel Family was entered into the 15th Moscow International Film Festival.

Selected filmography
 Dirk van Haveskerke (1978)
 The van Paemel Family (1986)

References

External links

1921 births
1999 deaths
20th-century Belgian male actors
Belgian film directors
Belgian male film actors
People from Berlare